Philip Lovett Ridings  (2 October 1917 – 13 September 1998) was an Australian cricketer.

Nicknamed "Pancho", Ridings played first-class cricket for South Australia from 1937 to 1957, scoring nine hundreds. Primarily a batsman, he also took 61 first-class wickets with his fast-medium pace bowling. He was captain of the South Australia team that officially complained to the New South Wales Cricket Association over the Sid Barnes twelfth man incident.

After his playing days, Ridings was a cricket administrator and Chairman of the Australian Cricket Board from 1980 to 1983.

Ridings was appointed Officer of the Order of Australia in 1982.

References

External links

1917 births
1998 deaths
Australian cricketers
South Australia cricketers
Australian cricket administrators
Australia national cricket team selectors
Cricketers from Adelaide
Officers of the Order of Australia